Jos Van de Poel (born 18 February 1954) is a Belgian racing cyclist. He rode in the 1979 Tour de France.

References

1954 births
Living people
Belgian male cyclists
Place of birth missing (living people)